Ager or AGER may refer to:

Ager (surname)
Ager (river), a river in Upper Austria
Àger, a municipality in Catalonia, Spain
Viscounty of Àger, a medieval Catalan jurisdiction that branched off the County of Urgell
Ager, California, unincorporated community
AGER, a US Navy designation for a type of "environmental research" technical research ship (in actuality a spy ship)
AGER, an alternate name for the protein RAGE (receptor)

See also
Agir (disambiguation)
Aegir (disambiguation)
Age (disambiguation)